Branded a Coward is a 1935 American Western film directed by Sam Newfield. it was the first of Johnny Mack Brown's Westerns made for producer A.W. Hackel's Supreme Picetures.

Cast 
 Johnny Mack Brown as Johnny Hume
 Billie Seward as Ethel Carson
 Syd Saylor as Oscar
 Lloyd Ingraham as Joe Carson
 Lee Shumway as Tom Hume
 Roger Williams as Henchman Tex
 Frank McCarroll as Henchman Dick
 Yakima Canutt as 'The Cat' (original)
 Mickey Rentschler as Young Johnny Hume
 Rex Downing as Young Billy Hume

External links 
 
 

1935 films
1935 Western (genre) films
American black-and-white films
American Western (genre) films
1930s English-language films
Films directed by Sam Newfield
1930s American films